The 2021 Aspria Tennis Cup was a professional tennis tournament played on clay courts. It was the fifteenth edition of the tournament which was part of the 2021 ATP Challenger Tour. It took place in Milan, Italy between 21 and 27 June 2021.

Singles main-draw entrants

Seeds

 1 Rankings are as of 14 June 2021.

Other entrants
The following players received wildcards into the singles main draw:
  Raúl Brancaccio
  Gian Marco Moroni
  Luca Vanni

The following player received entry into the singles main draw as a special exempt:
  Manuel Guinard

The following player received entry into the singles main draw using a protected ranking:
  Viktor Galović

The following player received entry into the singles main draw as an alternate:
  Nino Serdarušić

The following players received entry from the qualifying draw:
  Duje Ajduković
  Jonáš Forejtek
  Orlando Luz
  Giulio Zeppieri

Champions

Singles

  Gian Marco Moroni def.  Federico Coria 6–3, 6–2.

Doubles

  Vít Kopřiva /  Jiří Lehečka def.  Dustin Brown /  Tristan-Samuel Weissborn 6–4, 6–0.

References

2021 ATP Challenger Tour
2021
2021 in Italian tennis
June 2021 sports events in Italy